Eastside is an area of Swansea, Wales which is loosely defined as the populated areas to the east of the River Tawe.  The Swansea local authority has a housing authority covering Eastside which covers the areas of Birchgrove, Talycoppa, Trallwn, Winch Wen, Port Tennant and St Thomas.

See also
Swansea East (UK Parliament constituency)

References

Districts of Swansea